Stephen George Stone (born September 26, 1952) is a Canadian former professional ice hockey player, who played two in the National Hockey League for the Vancouver Canucks in 1974. The rest of his career was mainly spent in the minor International Hockey League, where he played from 1972 until retiring in 1977.

Playing career
Born in Toronto, Ontario, he played in the 1965 Quebec International Pee-Wee Hockey Tournament with a minor ice hockey team from Toronto.

Stone played his junior hockey for the Niagara Falls Flyers alongside future NHL stars such as Don Lever, Eric Vail, and Jim Schoenfeld. He was selected 131st overall in the 1972 NHL Amateur Draft by the Vancouver Canucks, who had just taken his junior linemate Lever 3rd overall and hoped the two could continue their exploits in pro.

Stone would put up big numbers in the minors in his first two seasons in Vancouver's system and earned a callup midway through the 1973–74 season, appearing in two games on January 11 and January 12, 1974, without recording a point. He would eventually fall out of the Canucks' plans, toiling for three more seasons in the International Hockey League before retiring in 1977.

Career statistics

Regular season and playoffs

References

External links

1952 births
Living people
Canadian ice hockey right wingers
Des Moines Capitols players
Niagara Falls Flyers (1960–1972) players
Port Huron Flags players
Ice hockey people from Toronto
Seattle Totems (WHL) players
Vancouver Canucks draft picks
Vancouver Canucks players